The Embassy of Spain in Lima is the diplomatic mission of Spain in Peru. Its address is Av. Jorge Basadre 498, San Isidro, Lima.

The current Spanish ambassador to Peru is Alejandro Alvargonzález San Martín.

History
Both countries officially established relations on August 15, 1879, under Alfonso XII and have since maintained diplomatic relations with a brief exception during the years 1936 to 1939 as a result of the Spanish Civil War.

During the internal conflict in Peru, like other embassies, the embassy was targeted, as it was affected by a series of embassy bombings that took place on February 21, 1986 and also targeted the Chinese, German, Romanian, Japan, Chilean and Argentine embassies.

Peru also maintains an Embassy in Madrid, headed by an Ambassador.

References

Spain
Lima
Peru–Spain relations